Kadeem Alleyne (born 1 January 2001) is a Barbadian cricketer. In August 2021, he was named in the Saint Lucia Kings' squad for the 2021 Caribbean Premier League. He made his Twenty20 debut on 9 September 2021, for the Saint Lucia Kings in the 2021 Caribbean Premier League.

References

External links
 

2001 births
Living people
Barbadian cricketers
Place of birth missing (living people)